Curravanish is a small townland in the south-west of County Wicklow, Ireland.

References

Townlands of County Wicklow